Anthemiphyllia is a genus of corals within the family Anthemiphylliidae. There are currently 8 extant and 2 extinct species assigned to the genus.

Species 

 † Anthemiphyllia catinata 
 Anthemiphyllia dentata 
 Anthemiphyllia frustum 
 Anthemiphyllia grossa 
 Anthemiphyllia macrolobata 
 Anthemiphyllia multidentata 
 Anthemiphyllia pacifica 
 † Anthemiphyllia patella 
 Anthemiphyllia patera 
 Anthemiphyllia spinifera

References 

Scleractinia
Scleractinia genera